Discovery Home & Health was a British and Irish television satellite and cable channel. It was launched on 1 July 2000 as part of the Discovery Channel's bouquet of channels, as Discovery Health, following a similar format to the American channel of the same name.

It was rebranded on 7 May 2005 to its current name, and relaunched as a female oriented lifestyle channel. This coincided with the relaunch of Discovery Home & Leisure as Discovery Real Time, a male oriented channel.

On 30 April 2013, Discovery Home & Health received a new look, following the closure of Discovery Real Time and Discovery Travel & Living, and began broadcasting in widescreen, the last of Discovery's UK channels to do so. Some programming from the closed channels was transferred over to Home & Health. At the same time the channels also moved into Real Time's old EPG slots on Sky and did so on Virgin Media on 7 May 2013.

The network was superseded by the streaming platform Discovery+, which effectively carries all of its content, and it was discontinued with immediate effect on 6 January 2021, the same fate which befell Discovery Shed.

Programming

References

External links 
 Discovery Channel UK

Home Health
Television channels and stations established in 2000
Television channels and stations disestablished in 2021
2000 establishments in the United Kingdom
2021 disestablishments in the United Kingdom
Defunct television channels in the United Kingdom
Television channel articles with incorrect naming style